was a railway station on the Nemuro Main Line in Urahoro, Hokkaido, Japan, operated by Hokkaido Railway Company (JR Hokkaido). Opened in 1926, it closed in March 2017.

Lines
The station was numbered "K41".

Layout

Adjacent stations

History
The station opened on 1 August 1926. A new wooden station structure was built in 1953.

With the privatization of Japanese National Railways (JNR) on 1 April 1987, the station came under the control of JR Hokkaido. The station was destaffed in 1992.

Closure
The station closed following the last day of services on 3 March 2017.

See also
 List of railway stations in Japan

References

External links

  

Railway stations in Hokkaido Prefecture
Stations of Hokkaido Railway Company
Railway stations in Japan opened in 1926
Railway stations closed in 2017
2017 disestablishments in Japan